Manwan Ni Hel is the lowest point in Union Council Berote Kalan located on the right bank of the Jhelum River of Abbottabad District, Khyber Pakhtunkhwa, Pakistan. It serves as a tripoint for the internal provincial borders of Khyber Pakhtunkhwa, Punjab and Azad Jammu & Kashmir.

References

Populated places in Abbottabad District
Internal borders of Pakistan